(formerly ) is a commercial radio station operating in the Fukuoka Prefecture of Japan. It is an affiliate of the Japan FM League.

History

 December 9, 1992 - FM Kyūshū Co. Ltd. was founded.
 April 2004 - FM Kyūshū sets up a studio at the Hakata Station called .
 June 30, 2008 - FM Kyūshū signed off for some changes.
 July 1, 2008 - FM Kyūshū relaunches as Cross FM.
 April 28, 2016 - Cross FM was acquired by DHC Corp.

Former Slogans as FM Kyūshū
 "Kyūshū's Number One Music Station!"
 "Pacific Power Station"

Features

Time Signal

As FM Kyūshū
 "This is Cross FM. After the tone, it's _ o'clock."

As Cross FM
 BGM -  - signal (without sponsor)
 CM -  - signal (with sponsor)

Life Information
 Headline News
 Traffic Information
 Weather Information
 Drive and Weather Information
 Sports Line

Programming

source:

Navigators
 Hisae Aigoshi
 Alice
 Maki Ariga
 D-High-LoW
 fumika
 Funkist
 Honey
 Racer Kashima
 Natsuko Kondo
 Makoto Kosaka
 Yuta Kozuma
 Zentaro Kurita
 Lucy
 Masaki
 Akiko Matsumoto
 The Mercury Sound
 Moby
 Tetsuzo Motoki
 Mye
 Ryuta Nobukawa
 Pe'z
 Prague
 Shirley Tomioka-Sheridan (see also FM802)
 Ritsuko Tateyama
 Toggy
 Shion Tsuji
 Yayoi Tsuruta
 Toru Yagi
 Marico Yamamoto
Source:

See also
 Japan FM League

Other stations in Fukuoka
 FM Fukuoka (JFN)
 Love FM (MegaNet)

References

External links
 
 
 

Radio stations in Japan
Radio in Japan
Companies based in Fukuoka Prefecture
Mass media in Fukuoka